Mimicry Dayanand is an Indian impressionist, stand-up comedian, actor and television presenter from the Karnataka state of India. He is renowned for his impression of politicians and film actors of Karnataka.

Dayanand has featured in many comedy albums and has presented a television show, Kachaguli that aired on ETV Kannada. In 2008, Dayanand, along with Sihi Kahi Chandru, judged a television show called Haasyada Rasa, to unearth comic talents that was aired on Kasturi. He also appeared on the comedy chat show Maja With Sruja on the Colors Kannada Kannada channel, imitating Brahmanda Narendra Babu Sharma, a well-known astrologer.

Filmography

Films           
 Parashuram (1989)...M. Prabhakara
 Shhh! (1992)...Dayananda Theertha Swamiji
 Operation Antha (1995)
 Vishwa (1999)
 Ekadanta (2007)
 Lifeu Ishtene (2011)...Pinky Lal
 Nandeesha (2012)
 Colors in Bangalore (2013)
 Navarangi (2014)
 Uppi 2 (2015)...Swami Akhilananda
 Ishtakamya (2016)

Television 
  Majaa Talkies (2018–present)

References

External links 

 

Year of birth missing (living people)
Living people
Male actors in Kannada cinema
Indian male film actors
Indian male television actors
Male actors from Karnataka
Male actors in Kannada television
Indian male comedians
20th-century Indian male actors
21st-century Indian male actors
Indian stand-up comedians